"From the Heart" is a 1999 single by Another Level, recorded for the soundtrack of the 1999 film Notting Hill, and subsequently included on their second album, Nexus. Written by Diane Warren, it reached #6 on the UK Singles Chart.

Covers 
British musical theatre actress and singer Elaine Paige recorded a version of the song in 2000, which was released on her 2004 compilation Centre Stage: The Very Best of Elaine Paige.
US dance producer Frankie Knuckles remixed the song. An edit of the remix appears on the UK single.

Charts

Weekly charts

Year-end charts

Certifications

References

1999 singles
1999 songs
Another Level (band) songs
Songs written by Diane Warren
Contemporary R&B ballads
1990s ballads